Outer old Seoul or Seongjeosimni (Hangul: 성저십리, Hanja: 城底十里) was the area of Seoul located outside of the Fortress Wall but within the city limits during the Joseon period. Outer old Seoul corresponds to the island of Yeouido and present-day Seoul city districts of Eunpyeong, Mapo, Seodaemun, Yongsan, Dongdaemun, Seongbuk, Gangbuk, and Seongdong.

History
Outer old Seoul was official territory of Hanseong-bu (한성부), the capital city of Joseon, meaning it did not belong to the two surrounding counties around old Seoul - Goyang and Yangju - but surrounded the urbanized Inner old Seoul, often referred as "the inside area of the Eight Gates of Seoul" or Sadaemun-an (사대문안). Unlike Inner old Seoul, the number of residents was relatively smaller and predominantly rural in character, with city authorities maintaining the region as a green belt by making deforestation and funeral burials within the area highly regulated or prohibited. Outer old Seoul was divided into several districts or Bang(방) - Yeonhui (연희방), Sangpyeong (상평방), Seogang (서강방), Yongsan (용산방), Sungsin (숭신방), Inchang (인창방), and Dumo (두모방) - at the time of late Joseon. Although the exact boundary is unknown, assumed natural borders are thought to be small rivers/streams of Hongje, Ui, and Jungnang, the Han River and Bukhansan mountain.

In 1914, Japanese colonial government transferred most of Outer old Seoul to Goyang County, with the exceptions being the small neighbourhoods of Changsin and Sungin, some eastern parts of Mapo, and western Yongsan. The Japanese used the transfer as a political scheme to minimise the city, then known as Keijō or Gyeongseong-bu (경성부), but most of this area was re-incorporated into Seoul from 1936 through to 1949 after Korean independence and the establishment of South Korea. 

Outer old Seoul was urbanized during Seoul's rapid growth during the mid-to-late 20th century, and through urban sprawl the entirety of the territory now lies within the city's single urban area.

References 
 최완기, 1997, <<한양>>, 서울: 교학사. (in Korean)
 고양시사편찬위원회, 2005, <<高陽市史>>, 고양: 고양시사편찬위원회. (in Korean)
 네이버 지식백과 지명편 (http://terms.naver.com/list.nhn?categoryId=2281&mobile) (in Korean)

History of Seoul